Călin Popescu (born 15 November 2001) is a Romanian professional footballer who plays as a midfielder for Liga I side FC Hermannstadt.

Honours
Sepsi OSK
Cupa României runner-up: 2019–20

References

External links
 
 
 

2001 births
Living people
Sportspeople from Brașov
Romanian footballers
Romania youth international footballers
Association football midfielders
Liga I players
Sepsi OSK Sfântu Gheorghe players
FC UTA Arad players
Liga II players
FC Brașov (1936) players
SSU Politehnica Timișoara players
FC Hermannstadt players